The 2009 Penrith Panthers season was the 43rd in the club's history. They competed in the National Rugby League's 2009 Telstra Premiership, finishing the regular season 11th (out of 16). The coach of the team was Matthew Elliott while Petero Civoniceva was the club's captain.

Fixtures 
The Panthers again use CUA Stadium as their home ground in 2009, their home ground since they entered the competition in 1967.

Regular season 

Legend:

Ladder

2009 Statistics

Jersey

Transfers

Gains

Losses

References

External links
Panthers official site

Penrith Panthers seasons
Penrith Panthers season